RLB-Präsident, also known as Reichsluftschutzbund Präsident or Präsident der RLB, was a Nazi paramilitary rank which was held by the supreme commander of the Reichsluftschutzbund.  The position of  RLB-Präsident was the highest rank of the Reichsluftschutzbund and was also considered a senior ministerial position within the Aviation Ministry of the Nazi Germany government.

The insignia for RLB-Präsident consisted of a white gold trimmed collar patch with three embroidered eagles. A thick gold shoulder board was also worn.

RLB-Präsident

References

Nazi paramilitary ranks